
The Grand National is a National Hunt horse race which is held annually at Aintree Racecourse near Liverpool, England. It is a handicap steeplechase over 30 fences and a distance of approximately 4 miles 3½ furlongs.

Aintree publish a roll of honour in their racecards each year, the earliest entries on which were compiled largely from the memories of racing enthusiasts sometime around 1880–1890. Aintree officials consider that their honours record prior to 1860 is likely to contain inaccuracies, and therefore the British Horseracing Board's records taken from the press accounts of the time have been used as a more reliable source for the connections of winners prior to 1865.

Weights given in stones and pounds.
Amateur jockeys denoted by a title, e.g. Mr, Capt, Lord.

Unofficial winners

Pre-1839
The first official running of the "Grand National" is now considered to be the 1839 Grand Liverpool Steeplechase. There had been a similar race for several years prior to this, but its status as an official Grand National was revoked some time between 1862 and 1873.

1916–18
For three years during World War I, the Grand National could not be run at Aintree, and so a substitute event was held at another racecourse, Gatwick. This venue is now defunct, and it is presently the site of London Gatwick Airport. The course was modified to make it similar to Aintree, and the races were contested over the same distance, with one fence fewer to be jumped. The 1916 running was titled the Racecourse Association Steeplechase and for the next two years it was known as the War National.

Winners

 The 1843 winner Vanguard was trained at Lord Chesterfield's private stables at Bretby Hall.

References

External links
 Racing Post:

 Aintree – Grand National Media Guide.
 aintree.co.uk – Winners 1886–present.
 horseracinghistory.co.uk – Grand National.
 pedigreequery.com – Grand National – Aintree.
 tbheritage.com – The Grand National.